Palasbari Assembly constituency is one of the 126 assembly constituencies of Assam Legislative Assembly. Palasbari forms part of the Gauhati Lok Sabha constituency

Members of Legislative Assembly 
 1951: Emonsing M Sangma, Independent
 1957: Radhika Ram Das, Indian National Congress
 1962: Radhika Ram Das, Indian National Congress
 1967: A. K. Goswami, Indian National Congress
 1972: Harendra Nath Talukdar, Indian National Congress
 1978: Harendra Goswami, Janata Party
 1983: Mohan Basumatari, Indian National Congress
 1985: Jatin Mali, Independent
 1991: Jatin Mali, Asom Gana Parishad
 1996: Jatin Mali, Asom Gana Parishad
 2001: Pranab Kalita, Independent
 2006: Pranab Kalita, Independent
 2011: Jatin Mali, Independent
 2016: Pranab Kalita, Bharatiya Janata Party
 2021: Hemanga Thakuria, Bharatiya Janata Party

Election results

2016 result

2011 result

External links 
 

Assembly constituencies of Assam